Huangnaihai Township (Mandarin: 黄乃亥乡) is a township in Tongren County, Huangnan Tibetan Autonomous Prefecture, Qinghai, China. In 2010, Huangnaihai Township had a total population of 3,152 people: 1,592 males and 1,560 females: 769 under 14 years old, 2,152 aged between 15 and 64 and 231 over 65 years old.

References 

Township-level divisions of Qinghai
Huangnan Tibetan Autonomous Prefecture